Epiphthora megalornis is a moth of the family Gelechiidae. It was described by Edward Meyrick in 1904. It is found in Australia, where it has been recorded from Western Australia.

The forewings are whitish, finely irrorated (sprinkled) with rather dark fuscous and with the costal edge slenderly white from one-fourth to three-fourths. The hindwings are rather dark grey.

References

Moths described in 1904
Epiphthora
Taxa named by Edward Meyrick